Eernegem is a town in the Ichtegem municipality, in the province of West Flanders in Belgium.

Populated places in West Flanders